The 1976 United States Grand Prix West was a Formula One motor race held on March 28, 1976, in Long Beach, California. The race was the third round of the 1976 Formula One season and the first new race to be added to the calendar since the Brazilian and Swedish Grand Prix were added in 1973. It was the second Formula One race held in California, the first being the 1960 United States Grand Prix at Riverside, only 50 miles away. The race was held over 80 laps of the 3.251-kilometre street circuit for a total race distance of 260 kilometres.

The race was won by Swiss driver Clay Regazzoni in a Ferrari 312T by 42 seconds over team mate and championship points leader, Austrian driver Niki Lauda. French driver Patrick Depailler finished third driving a Tyrrell 007.

Summary

Italy was the first country to host two Championship Formula One races in the same year in 1957. The United States would become the second as the first USGP West at Long Beach, California, appeared on the 1976 F1 calendar, along with the long-standing autumn race at Watkins Glen, New York. The new race's organizers, headed by British businessman and Long Beach resident Chris Pook, could not have done a better job in their attempt to create an 'American Monaco.' An unending list of former Champions was present for the weekend's vintage race, including Denny Hulme, Jack Brabham, and Juan Manuel Fangio himself. Dan Gurney and American Champion Phil Hill were also in attendance after helping to conceive and promote the event.

When the cars took to the track, the drivers differed in their opinions of the concrete-lined street circuit which featured two hairpins and a long, curving waterfront "straight." Ferrari's reigning World Champion Niki Lauda said the course was much bumpier than Monaco and harder on the car, but easier on the driver. Emerson Fittipaldi said he liked it very much, but Frenchmen Jacques Laffite and Patrick Depailler would not agree. In qualifying, Lauda led first, then James Hunt's McLaren, and finally Clay Regazzoni in the second Ferrari. After spending much of the session with ignition trouble, Depailler made a last-minute bid and slotted his Tyrrell onto the front row in second, less than two-tenths off the Ferrari's pace. The Formula One Constructors' Association had decided to limit the field to twenty starters for safety reasons, because of the narrow concrete canyons necessitated by the street layout, and seven cars failed to qualify.

At the start, Regazzoni rocketed away and settled into the lead, ahead of Hunt, Depailler, and teammate Lauda. Exiting the first turn, Vittorio Brambilla squeezed Carlos Reutemann into the wall, putting both cars out. Then, on the curving back "straight" by the harbor, Gunnar Nilsson's Lotus broke its rear suspension and jerked hard into the wall at 160 miles per hour. He emerged with only a stiff neck.

On lap four, Hunt was bearing down on Depailler for second place. He tried to slip inside the Tyrrell entering the right-hand hairpin just before the back straight, but Depailler closed the door, forcing Hunt to go around on the left. As they exited the corner side-by-side, Depailler moved across and pushed the McLaren into the barrier. Hunt yanked himself from his car, certain that it was undrivable, and shook his fist at Depailler each time the Frenchman came around. After the race, the McLaren mechanics came to retrieve the car and were able to drive it back to the pits!

On the same lap, John Watson bumped Laffite's Ligier from behind, breaking the nose on his Penske. Laffite was spun around by the contact and dropped from eighth to fourteenth place. Meanwhile, Lauda made his way by Depailler on lap five and took second place, seven seconds behind Regazzoni, who was beginning to seem untouchable. Mario Andretti had moved from fifteenth on the grid to ninth in the Parnelli VPJ 4B-Ford, including the fastest lap to that point, but was finished when he lost the water in his engine (although he didn't actually stop until lap 15 when the engine had completely cooked).

This would be the last race for the American Vel's-Parnelli car. Over three seasons, it competed in 16 races, with Mario the car's only driver. Upon retiring from the race in Long Beach, Andretti was approached by a television reporter in the pits, asking, "How about this being your last race in Formula One?" Andretti replied, "What are you talking about?" The reporter said, "That's what Vel (Miletich) told me." Andretti said, "It may have been his last Grand Prix, but it won't be mine."

Andretti terminated his relationship with Miletich and Parnelli Jones that day, but the next morning, by accident, joined Lotus team manager Colin Chapman for breakfast in a Long Beach coffee shop, where the two forged an agreement. By the next season, with Andretti driving Chapman's revolutionary Lotus 78, the two were winning races together and, of course, in 1978, captured the World Championship.

At about the same time as Andretti's retirement from the race, Depailler spun and dropped from third to seventh, and after 20 laps, Regazzoni led by 13 seconds over Lauda, Jody Scheckter and Tom Pryce in the Shadow. Depailler, furious over his mistake, was storming back up the line as he got by Jean-Pierre Jarier and Ronnie Peterson within six laps. When Pryce broke a driveshaft on lap 33 and Scheckter had a front wishbone snap on lap 34, Depailler was back in third place, behind the two Ferraris.

After his incident with Watson, Laffite had driven brilliantly in just the third race for the new Matra-powered Ligier. He passed Jochen Mass on lap 45, and Jarier on lap 46 to take over fourth place. With 20 laps to go, Lauda was having trouble selecting gears and decided to try to nurse the car home rather than make a run at Regazzoni. Jarier had dropped to sixth behind Mass, also with gearbox trouble. Then, on the next to last lap, with only first and fifth gears left, he was also overtaken by Fittipaldi, who scored the first Championship point for his own Copersucar team.

Regazzoni took an easy win, the fourth of his career, completing the Grand Chelem of pole position, fastest lap, victory, and leading every lap. Lauda successfully brought his ailing car home second, 42 seconds back, and Depailler completed a fine recovery from his spin by taking third. The first USGP West was a success. Indeed, former team manager Rob Walker said, "I think the creation of the Long Beach GP was the greatest achievement in motor racing this decade."

Classification

Qualifying

*Drivers in red failed to qualify

Race

Championship standings after the race

Drivers' Championship standings

Constructors' Championship standings

Note: Only the top five positions are included for both sets of standings.

References

Further reading
 Doug Nye (1978). The United States Grand Prix and Grand Prize Races, 1908-1977. B. T. Batsford. 
 Rob Walker (July, 1976). "1st United States Grand Prix West: Regga Runs Away". Road & Track, 78-82.

United States Grand Prix West
United States Grand Prix West
United States Grand Prix West
United States Grand Prix West